The 2004 Tour du Haut Var was the 36th edition of the Tour du Haut Var cycle race and was held on 21 February 2004. The race started and finished in Draguignan. The race was won by Marc Lotz.

General classification

References

2004
2004 in road cycling
2004 in French sport
February 2004 sports events in France